Clarke Sound is an uninhabited Foxe Basin waterway in Qikiqtaaluk, Nunavut, Canada. It is located between North Tweedsmuir Island and Baffin Island.

The sound was named after Louis Colville Gray Clarke, curator of the Museum of Archaeology and Anthropology, University of Cambridge.

References

Sounds of Qikiqtaaluk Region
Bodies of water of Baffin Island
Foxe Basin